The Roman Catholic Diocese of Fort-Liberté, erected 31 January 1991, is a suffragan of the Archdiocese of Cap-Haïtien. On 25 October 2014, Pope Francis appointed Quesnel Alphonse, S.M.M. as bishop of Fort-Liberté.

Ordinaries
Hubert Constant, O.M.I. (1991-2003), appointed Archbishop of Cap-Haïtien
Chibly Langlois (2004-2011), appointed Bishop of Les Cayes; future Cardinal
Max Leroy Mésidor (2012-2013), appointed coadjutor archbishop of the Roman Catholic Archdiocese of Cap-Haïtien by Pope Francis on November 1, 2013
Quesnel Alphonse, S.M.M. (2014- )

See also
Roman Catholicism in Haiti
Fort-Liberté

References

External links and references

GCatholic.org page for this diocese

Fort-Liberte
Fort-Liberte
1991 establishments in Haiti
Fort-Liberté
Roman Catholic Ecclesiastical Province of Cap-Haïtien